The 73rd annual Cannes Film Festival was scheduled to take place from 12 to 23 May 2020. On 13 January 2020, Spike Lee was named as the president of the Jury. However, due to the COVID-19 pandemic in France, festival management announced on 14 April 2020 that the festival could not be held in its "original form", with alternative means of observing the festival being explored. It was cancelled for the first time since 1968.

Earlier, festival management considered holding the festival in June or July, after not cancelling the event. In mid-March, the festival's main venue, the Grand Auditorium Louis Lumière, was converted into a temporary homeless shelter. In May 2020, it was announced that no physical edition of the festival would take place, but a revised Official Selection of films was confirmed on 3 June 2020. Before announcing the list of films from the official selection, Thierry Frémaux the director of the Cannes Film Festival, said in an interview that he was talking with Spike Lee and also was hoping to have him as president of the jury on the 2021 edition. He also confirmed that Lee's film Da 5 Bloods was supposed to be the return of Netflix to the red carpet in the Out of Competition category.

In September, organizers announced that a limited outdoor festival, featuring screenings of four official selection films, the short film competition and the Cinéfondation Selection would take place on the Croisette from 27 to 29 October. The Semaine de la critique program also launched a free online screening of its short film selections in October.

Official selection
The Official Selection has been divided in sub-categories, as directors or genres, not as competitors.

The Faithful (or at least selected once before)

The Newcomers

Omnibus Film

The First Features

Documentary Films

Comedy Films

Animated Films

Short films
The films selected for the short film competition were announced on 19 June, a few weeks after the rest of the official selections. Despite the cancellation of the overall festival, the short films were announced with an indication that the  competition would still proceed in the fall, with the exact dates and jury members to be named at a later date; in September, it was announced that the short films would be screened as part of the special outdoor screening series on the Croisette in October.

At the end of the Croisette screening series, the Short Film Palme d'Or was awarded to Sameh Alaa for the film I'm Afraid to Forget Your Face.

Cinéfondation Selection
The Short Films and Cinéfondation Jury composed of Damien Bonnard, Rachid Bouchareb, Claire Burger, Charles Gillibert, Dea Kulumbegashvili and Céline Sallette, has awarded the 2020 Prizes of the Cinéfondation film school competition on 28 October 2020 on the stage of the Grand Théâtre Lumière as part of “Cannes 2020 Special”. The First Prize was awarded to Ashmita Guha Neogi for the film Catdog, the Second Prize was awarded to Yelyzaveta Pysmak for the film My Fat Arse and I and the Joint Third Prize was awarded to Lucia Chicos for the film Contraindications.

Cannes Classics
The full line-up for the Cannes Classics section was announced on 17 July 2020.

Restorations

Martin Scorsese’s The Film Foundation celebrate its 30th birthday

Federico 100

À Bout de souffle and L’Avventura turn 60

Documentaries 2020

Parallel sections

International Critics' Week

The following films have received a special and official label, delivered by the International Critics' Week.

Features

Short films

Directors' Fortnight

A full Directors' Fortnight selection could not be announced due to it being incomplete when the festival was cancelled. However, two titles were announced in July 2020 so that they could utilise the Director's Fortnight label.

ACID

The following films have received a special and official label, delivered by the ACID (Association for the Distribution of Independent Cinema).

 

The ACID Trip #4 program, which should have been dedicated to young Chilean cinema, has been postponed to the next edition, in 2021.

References

External links
 

2020 controversies
Film controversies
Film controversies in France
Obscenity controversies in film
Political controversies in film
Controversies in France
2020 in film
Mass media and entertainment controversies
2020 film festivals
2020 in French cinema
2020
Festivals cancelled due to the COVID-19 pandemic
Impact of the COVID-19 pandemic on cinema